Fait Accompli may refer to:

Fait accompli, a French phrase commonly used to describe an action that is completed before those affected by it are in a position to query or reverse it
fait accompli, the blog of Nick Piombino
Fait Accompli, a racehorse, the 1972 winner of the Perth Cup
Fait Accompli (film), a 1998 film by Andrzej Sekuła
"Fait Accompli", an episode of the TV series Alias

Music
Fait Accompli, a 2003 album by Spencer P. Jones
Fait Accompli (album), a 2014 album by Canibus
"Faît Accompli" (Curve song), 1992
"Fait accompli" (BAO song), 2007
"Fait Accompli", a 1989 promotional single by Yukihiro Takahashi